This list of fossil fishes described in 2016 is a list of new taxa of jawless vertebrates, placoderms, acanthodians, fossil cartilaginous fishes, bony fishes and other fishes of every kind that have been described during the year 2016, as well as other significant discoveries and events related to paleontology of fishes that occurred in the year 2016. The list only includes taxa at the level of genus or species.

Research
 Tullimonstrum gregarium is argued to be a stem-lamprey by McCoy et al. (2016).
 A study of the eye anatomy of Tullimonstrum gregarium is published by Clements et al. (2016).
 New information on the anatomy of the Carboniferous taxa Mayomyzon pieckoensis and Myxinikela siroka is published by Gabbott et al. (2016), who report the presence of melanosomes in their eyes; the authors also conduct a study on the phylogenetic relationships of these species, finding Mayomyzon to be a relative of lampreys and finding Myxinikela to be a relative of hagfish.
 A study on the phylogenetic relationships of Palaeospondylus gunni is published by Hirasawa, Oisi & Kuratani (2016), who interpret it as a probable stem-hagfish.
 New information on the dermal bone histology and phylogenetic relationships of the jawless anaspids, published by Keating & Donoghue (2016), reveal that they are a monophyletic group nested within skeletonizing vertebrates, rather than early relatives of lampreys and hagfish.
 A study on the phylogenetic relationships of early jawed vertebrates is published by Qiao et al. (2016).
 A study on the ontogenetic composition of the Devonian placoderm material known from the Strud quarry (Namur Province, Belgium) is published by Olive et al. (2016), who interpret the Strud locality as representing a placoderm nursery.
 A description of the general anatomy, morphology and histology of dermal elements and the endoskeletal shoulder girdle of three Devonian (Eifelian-Givetian) species of acanthodians known from Scotland (Diplacanthus crassisimus, Diplacanthus tenuistriatus and Rhadinacanthus longispinus) is published by Burrow et al. (2016).
 Fossil tooth of a member of the genus Lagarodus (a cartilaginous fish belonging to the group Euchondrocephali, of uncertain phylogenetic placement within the latter group) is reported for the first time from the Carboniferous of Svalbard by Cuny, Kristensen & Stemmerik (2016).
 A study on the enameloid ultrastructure of the teeth of members of the genus Ptychodus recovered from the Lincoln Limestone of the Greenhorn Formation (Barton County, Kansas, USA) and its implications for the phylogenetic placement of the genus is published by Hoffman, Hageman & Claycomb (2016).
 A specimen of Galeorhinus cuvieri (fossil relative of the school shark) with preserved soft tissues and stomach contents (indicating that it preyed on Eocene relatives of the living barracudas) is described from the Eocene (Ypresian) Monte Bolca site in Italy by Fanti et al. (2016).
 A redescription of the Miocene shark Glyphis pagoda is published by Shimada et al. (2016).
 A study of geographical distribution patterns and global abundance of Carcharocles megalodon from the Miocene to the Pliocene, and a discussion of the possible causes of its extinction, is published by Pimiento et al. (2016).
 A study on the growth history of the teeth of Andreolepis hedei is published by Chen et al. (2016).
 A study on the anatomical diversification of teleosts and holosteans during 160 million years of their evolution (Permian–Early Cretaceous) is published by Clarke, Lloyd & Friedman (2016).
 Specimens of Saurichthys costasquamosus, Saurichthys macrocephalus and Saurichthys paucitrichus with preserved casts of gastrointestinal tract are described by Argyriou et al. (2016).
 A redescription of Ionoscopus petrarojae and a study on the phylogenetic relationships of the species is published by Taverne & Capasso (2016).
 A redescription and a study on the phylogenetic relationships of Dapedium pholidotum, based on new fossil material from the Jurassic (Toarcian) Posidonia Shale (Germany) is published by Thies & Waschkewitz (2016), who name a new order Dapediiformes including the family Dapediidae.
 A redescription and a study on the phylogenetic relationships of the dapediiform species Hemicalypterus weiri is published by Gibson (2016).
 A study on the anatomy of the Carboniferous teleost relative Aetheretmon and its implications for the evolution of tail and caudal fin of vertebrates in published by Sallan (2016).
 A redescription of the anatomy of the Early Cretaceous osteoglossiform Chanopsis lombardi known from the Democratic Republic of the Congo is published by Taverne (2016).
 A specimen of an osteoglossid fish, putatively referred to the species Ridewoodichthys caheni, is described from the Paleocene (Danian) of Angola by Taverne (2016).
 A study on the anatomy and phylogenetic relationships of the ellimmichthyiform Codoichthys carnavalii is published by de Figueiredo & Ribeiro (2016).
 Fossilized hearts are reported in two specimens of Rhacolepis buccalis by Maldanis et al. (2016).
 A phylogenetic study of spiny-rayed teleosts, including Late Cretaceous fossil taxa and that recovers the molecular-based interrelationships with morphological information for the first time, is published by Davesne et al. (2016).
 Meemannia eos, initially classified as a lobe-finned fish, is reinterpreted as an early-diverging ray-finned fish by Lu et al. (2016).
 Description of new skull material of Qingmenodus yui from Pragian of China and a study of phylogenetic relationships of onychodonts is published by Lu et al. (2016).
 Clement et al. (2016) reconstruct the shape of the brain of the Devonian lungfish Rhinodipterus kimberleyensis on the basis of a CT scan of its endocast.
 Virtual cranial endocast of Dipnorhynchus sussmilchi is reconstructed by Clement et al. (2016).

New taxa

Jawless vertebrates

Placoderms

Acanthodians

Cartilaginous fishes

Bony fishes

References

2016 in paleontology